La Coupe de l'Outre-Mer de football 2008 was the inaugural edition of the Coupe de l'Outre-Mer. The competition took place between 24 September 2008 and 4 October 2008 in Île-de-France, France.

Venues
Stade Marville – La Courneuve (Seine Saint-Denis)
Stade Jean Rolland – Franconville (Val d'Oise)
Stade Municipal – Melun (Seine et Marne)
Complexe Sportif Léo Lagrange – Bonneuil (Val de Marne)
Stade Dominique Duvauchelle – Créteil (Val de Marne)
Stade Yves du Manoir – Colombes (Hauts de Seine)
Stade Léo Lagrange – Poissy (Yvelines)
Stade Henri Longuet – Viry-Châtillon (Essonne)

Participants
 Guadeloupe
 Martinique
 French Guiana
 Réunion
 Mayotte
 New Caledonia
 Tahiti (represented by AS Manu-Ura)

Teams that did not compete
 Saint Pierre and Miquelon
 Wallis and Futuna
 Saint Martin
 Saint Barthélemy

Results

Group 1 

Note: 4 points for a win, 2 points for a win on penalties, 1 point for a loss on penalties

Group 2 

Note: 4 points for a win, 2 points for a win on penalties, 1 point for a loss on penalties

2nd round

5th Place Match:

3rd Place match:

Final

Top scorers 
 Mamoudou Diallo (4 goals)
 Lery Hannany (3 goals)

2008
2008–09 in French football
2008–09 in Caribbean football
2008–09 in OFC football
2008 in African football